Piatra may refer to the following places:

In Romania:
Piatra Neamț, a city in Neamț County
Piatra-Olt, a town in Olt County
Piatra, Teleorman, a commune in Teleorman County
Piatra, a village in Brăduleț, Argeș County
Piatra, a village in Ciofrângeni, Argeș County
Piatra, a village in Stoenești, Argeș County
Piatra, a village in Chiuza, Bistrița-Năsăud County
Piatra, a village in Mihail Kogălniceanu, Constanța County
Piatra, a village in Runcu, Dâmbovița County
Piatra, a village in Bătrâna, Hunedoara County
Piatra, a village in Remeți, Maramureș County
Piatra, a village in Cocorăștii Colț, Prahova County
Piatra, a village in Drajna, Prahova County
Piatra, a village in Provița de Jos, Prahova County
Piatra, a village in Ostrov, Tulcea County
Piatra Albă, a village in Odăile, Buzău County
Piatra Fântânele, a village in Tiha Bârgăului, Bistrița-Năsăud County
Piatra Mică, a village in Sângeru, Prahova County
Piatra Șoimului, a commune in Neamț County
Piatra Craiului Mountains, a mountain range in the Southern Carpathians
Piatra Mare Mountains, a small mountain range in Brașov County, southeast of Brașov, Romania
Piatra (Mureș), a tributary of the Mureș in Harghita County
Piatra, a tributary of the Negrișoara in Suceava County
Piatra, a tributary of the Slănic in Bacău County

In Moldova:
Piatra, Orhei, a commune in Orhei District
Piatra Albă, a village in Mileștii Mici, Ialoveni District

See also 
 Pietriș (disambiguation)
 Pietreni (disambiguation)
 Pietrari (disambiguation)
 Pietrosu (disambiguation)
 Pietrișu (disambiguation)
 Pietroasa (disambiguation)
 Pietroșani (disambiguation)
 Pietricica (disambiguation)
 Pietroșița
 Petre (disambiguation)